Samch'ŏn County is a county in South Hwanghae province, North Korea.

Administrative divisions
Samch'ŏn county is divided into 1 ŭp (town) and 19 ri (villages):

Transportation
Sam county is served by the Ŭllyul Line of the Korean State Railway.

References

Counties of South Hwanghae